The 1983 Ohio Valley Conference men's basketball tournament was the postseason men's basketball tournament of the Ohio Valley Conference during the 1982–83 NCAA Division I men's basketball season. It was held March 10–11, 1983. The semifinals and finals took place at Racer Arena in Murray, Kentucky. Two seed Morehead State won the tournament, defeating Akron in the championship game, and received the Ohio Valley's automatic bid to the NCAA tournament. The Eagles drew an 11 seed in the East region, facing the 6 seed Syracuse Orangemen.

Format
The top four eligible men's basketball teams in the Ohio Valley Conference received a berth in the conference tournament.  After the 14-game conference season, teams were seeded by conference record. The bottom four teams in the standings did not participate.

Bracket

References

Tournament
Ohio Valley Conference men's basketball tournament
Basketball competitions in Kentucky
Ohio Valley Conference men's basketball tournament
Ohio Valley Conference men's basketball tournament
Murray, Kentucky
College sports tournaments in Kentucky